In geometry, the small icosicosidodecahedron (or small icosified icosidodecahedron) is a nonconvex uniform polyhedron, indexed as U31. It has 52 faces (20 triangles, 12 pentagrams, and 20 hexagons), 120 edges, and 60 vertices.

Related polyhedra 

It shares its vertex arrangement with the great stellated truncated dodecahedron. It additionally shares its edges with the small ditrigonal dodecicosidodecahedron (having the triangular and pentagrammic faces in common) and the small dodecicosahedron (having the hexagonal faces in common).

See also 
 List of uniform polyhedra

References

External links 
 

Uniform polyhedra